Thetford Rural District was a rural district in Norfolk, England from 1894 to 1935.

It was formed under the Local Government Act 1894 based on the Thetford rural sanitary district. It covered the lands which were in Norfolk and lay to the north and east of Thetford Municipal Borough.

In 1902 it took in the western part of the disbanded Guiltcross Rural District,.

In 1935, Thetford RD was abolished and its territory divided between Downham, Swaffham and Wayland RDs.

Statistics

Parishes

References

Districts of England created by the Local Government Act 1894
Historical districts of Norfolk
Rural districts of England